This article contains information about the literary events and publications of 1555.

Events
unknown dates
The Portuguese humanist writer Achilles Statius relocates to Rome.
Roger Taverner is elected to the Parliament of England.
John Hooker becomes Chamberlain of Exeter.
The Facetious Nights of Straparola, a story collection by the Italian writer Giovanni Francesco Straparola originally published in 1550–1553, appears for the first time in a single volume.
The French humanist Christophe Plantin establishes the Plantin Press in Antwerp.

New books

Prose
Edmund Bonner – 
Gjon Buzuku –  (first book published in the Albanian language).
John Fisher (posthumously) – 
Fracastoro – Naugerius
Iacob Heraclid – 
Alonso de Molina – 
Olaus Magnus – Historia de Gentibus SeptentrionalibusJacques Peletier du Mans –  (The Art of Poetry)
Nicholas Ridley – A Brief Declaration of the Lorde's SupperWilliam Turner – A New Book of Spiritual PhysickGeorg Wickram – 

Drama
Étienne Jodelle – Didon se sacrifiantPoetry
Joachim du Bellay – Les RegretsBirths
June 11 – Lodovico Zacconi, Italian theologian and music writer (died 1627)
December 27 – Johann Arndt, German theologian (died 1621)Unknown datesLancelot Andrewes, English scholar and bishop (died 1626)
Richard Carew, English translator and antiquary (died 1620)
John Doddridge, English antiquary, lawyer and writer (died 1628)
Moderata Fonte, Venetian writer and poet (died 1592)
François de Malherbe, French poet, critic and translator (died 1628)
Thomas Watson, English poet writing in English and Latin (died 1592)

Deaths
February 9 – Christian Egenolff, German printer and publisher (born 1502)
April 18 – Polydore Vergil, English Tudor historian (born c. 1470)
July 2 – Girolamo dai Libri, Italian illuminator (born c. 1475)
October 9 – Justus Jonas, Lutheran theologian and hymn-writere (born 1493)Unknown date'' – Petrus Gyllius, French natural scientist and translator (born 1490)

References

Years of the 16th century in literature